Union of Invincible Eleven & Majestic Sports Association Inc., also known as Invincible Eleven (I.E.), is a Liberian football club based in Monrovia. They are Liberia's oldest club. Their home stadium is the Antonette Tubman Stadium. I.E. is one of Liberia's most popular and historic clubs, along with Mighty Barolle. George Weah, Liberia's most famous footballer and current president, scored 24 goals in 23 games during a spell at I.E. in the 1986/87 season.

History
I.E. traces their origin from Iron United, based in Clay-Ashland and Bombers, based in Monrovia. These teams were composed of young players between ages of 13 and 20, and mostly students of College of West Africa (CWA), St. Patrick's High School, and Liberia College. Both Iron United and Bombers were active between 1940 and 1942.

The young players of the two teams, especially students of CWA having established teamwork and amicable relationship, decided to pool their resources and form a single team, strong enough to compete favorably with the older and more experienced teams like Olympics and Bame Monrovia. A meeting with this agenda was summoned up at the residence of Joseph G. Richards's mother on Broad Street in May 1943. At this meeting the formation of team was unanimously agree upon.

After tossing around several ideas for naming a football team, the name Invincible Eleven was agreed upon. Those who attended that May 1943 meeting during which IE was formed included John Coleman (deceased), G. Aaron Grimes, Hugh Collins, Sammy Hodge, Lawrence Morgan, Austin Coleman, George Marshall, Othello Coleman, Zulu Cooper and Oscar Hemans-Yankey. At that meeting, Joseph G. Richards was elected first captain of the team.

While most of these young students were attending CWA and the team initially had the backing of the faculty of the institution, they were not the CWA team; among the members were students from Liberia College and St. Patrick's High School. Though it is true that most of the original members of the team were Americo-Liberians or Congos by virtue of their easy access to formal education at that time, yet it is equally incorrect to state that IE is an Americo-Liberian team. There were also students who were from the Kru, Bassa and Grebo ethnic backgrounds. For instance, Edmund Johnson, Robert Sherman, Tugbeh Anderson and Prince N. A. Brown were all Krus. Frank George, Aaron Grimes and Argwu, the goalie, were Bassas, while Hugh Collins was Grebo, thus giving the team an academic and broad ethnic base support from the onset.

The following month, June 1943, IE made its debut in football competitions after some weeks of hard practicing. The first three years were marked by constant defeats, as the members were young and inexperienced.  IE struck its first surprise in 1945, when it trounced "Olympics" 5–0. This victory was crucial in animating the spirit of sportsmanship and teamwork among the boys, for Olympics consisted of older and more experienced boys, mainly from Freetown. It was one of the oldest and leading teams. The Invincibility of IE, which was previously a laughing-stock, was then rested. For seven years afterwards it was almost not possible to draw with or beat IE. And football teams trembled when they had to encounter IE.

Between 1946–49 IE sustained a severe blow when seven or eight of its members left about the same time for further studies in the United States and other foreign parts.  However, they were replaced subsequently by some promising young players from the junior team, West End Eleven. Some of these young players, who in their own right also came into national prominence included, Sam Payne Cooper, Leonard Deshield, T. Ernest Eastman, Bruce Smith, E. Harding Smythe, Gabriel J. Tucker, and John Payne Tucker. Between 1950–51, some of these boys matriculated into schools abroad for further studies, thereby creating another vacuum. Coupled with the lack of support, IE was temporarily renamed "Pepperbird" by its sponsor Mr. Al Schoucair the owner of the Pepperbird Club. When Joseph G. Richards, one of the original founders of IE returned from abroad in December 1951, he recommended a return to the IE name. Together with the name of another its junior team, Majestics, the entire IE organization is today called IE Majestics Sports Association.

In April 2019 they were relegated to the Liberian Third Division after failing to pay a fine for not honoring a league match.

Achievements
Liberian Premier League: 13
 1963, 1964, 1965, 1966, 1980, 1981, 1983, 1984, 1985, 1987, 1997, 1998, 2007.

Liberian Cup: 5
 1987, 1991, 1997, 1998, 2011.

Performance in CAF competitions
CAF Champions League: 2 appearances
1999 – withdrew in Preliminary Round
2008 – Preliminary Round

African Cup of Champions Clubs: 7 appearances
1967 – First Round
1981 – First Round
1982 – Second Round
1984 – Preliminary Round
1985 – disqualified in First Round
1986 – First Round
1988 – First Round

CAF Confederation Cup: 1 appearance
2012 – First Round

CAF Cup Winners' Cup: 1 appearance
1992 – First Round

References

 
Football clubs in Liberia
Sport in Monrovia
1943 establishments in Liberia
Association football clubs established in 1943